John Sparrow (by 1516 – 1545/1546), of Ipswich, Suffolk, was an English politician.

He was a Member of Parliament (MP) for Ipswich in 1542.

References

1546 deaths
Members of the Parliament of England (pre-1707) for Ipswich
English MPs 1542–1544
Year of birth uncertain